Edwin Karger (May 6, 1883 – September 9, 1957) was a pitcher in Major League Baseball from 1906 to 1911. He played for the Pittsburgh Pirates, St. Louis Cardinals, Cincinnati Reds, and Boston Red Sox. Karger finished his career with a 48–67 win–loss record and a 2.79 earned run average. As a hitter, he was better than average for a pitcher, posting a .220 batting average (88-for-400) with 6 home runs and 35 RBI.

On August 11, 1907 in a game against the Boston Doves, Karger was given credit for a seven inning perfect game.

Karger lived in Alaska in the early 1940s.

See also
 List of St. Louis Cardinals team records

References

External links

, or Retrosheet, or SABR Biography Project Edwin Karger

1883 births
1957 deaths
Aberdeen Pheasants players
Aberdeen Grays players
Baseball players from Texas
Boston Red Sox players
Cincinnati Reds players
Houston Buffaloes players
Major League Baseball pitchers
Minor league baseball managers
People from San Angelo, Texas
Pittsburgh Pirates players
St. Louis Cardinals players
St. Paul Apostles players
St. Paul Saints (AA) players